Ahle Hadith Andolon Bangladesh is an Salafi Islamic organisation of Bangladesh. It was founded in the 1994s by Muhammad Asadullah Al-Ghalib, who continues to lead it as of 2016.

References 

Islamism in Bangladesh
Terrorism in Bangladesh